Jesús Gómez Santiago (born 24 April 1991) is a Spanish middle-distance runner. He won bronze medals in the 1500 metres at the 2019 and 2021 European Indoor Championships.

Gómez is a four-time Spanish national champion.

International competitions

Personal bests
 800 metres – 1:45.67 (Madrid 2017)
 800 metres indoor – 1:47.93 (Sabadell 2019)
 1500 metres – 3:33.07 (Monaco 2020)
 1500 metres indoor – 3:36.32 (Madrid 2021)
 3000 metres – 7:54.46 (Castellón 2020)
 3000 metres indoor – 7:48.76 (Valencia 2019)
Road
 10 kilometres – 30:08 (Jaén 2020)

References

External links
 
 
 
 

1991 births
Living people
Spanish male middle-distance runners
Sportspeople from Burgos
Athletes (track and field) at the 2018 Mediterranean Games
Mediterranean Games competitors for Spain
Athletes (track and field) at the 2020 Summer Olympics
Olympic athletes of Spain
21st-century Spanish people